Silion (also known as Virgin Island, Hilantagaan Diot or Pulo Diyot) is a small island in the municipality of Santa Fe in the Central Visayas region of the Philippines.

References

Barangays of Cebu